The climate of Muscat features a hot, arid climate with long and very hot summers and warm winters. In general, precipitation is scarce in Muscat with several months, on average, seeing only a trace of rainfall.

For sightseeing, the best time to visit Muscat is from November to February as the temperatures are moderate and pleasant, making it easy to move around.

Factors
Muscat being located in the Arabian peninsula features long and very hot summers similar to that of any Middle Eastern country. Rainfall in the city is very rare, mostly falling during winter months.

Shamal winds occur in Muscat during summer months. They are very dusty and remain at peak in the morning but decrease at night.
Sandstorm or Dust storm are phenomena which affect Muscat rarely during summer months.
Westerly winds bring winter showers to many parts of Oman including Muscat, coming from the Mediterranean or North Africa.
 The Southwest Monsoon only affects the Dhofar region of Oman where light rainfall occurs but upper parts of Oman including Muscat remain dry during this period.

Extreme weather events
The most extreme weather events in Oman are tropical storms that form in the Arabian sea. Following is the list of tropical storms that affected Oman, including Muscat, during the 21st century.

In 2002, a cyclonic storm hit the Dhofar region of Oman.
In 2007, a category 5 Cyclone Gonu caused squally winds and rains to the city of Muscat.
In 2010, a category 4 Cyclone Phet brought massive flooding to Muscat during early June.

References

Muscat
Geography of Muscat, Oman